Walking on a Mountain Path in Spring is a painting by Chinese artist Ma Yuan (c. 1160-1225). It is painted on an album leaf, which also contains Emperor Ningzong of Song's poem inscribed in the upper right corner.

Mountain Path is done in Ma Yuan's "One-Corner Ma" style, where most of the painting's imagery is in one corner.

References

11th-century paintings
12th-century paintings
Song dynasty paintings
National Palace Museum